The Mills House is a historic house at 715 West Barraque Street in Pine Bluff, Arkansas.  It is a -story wood-frame structure, three bays wide, with a front gable roof, weatherboard siding, and a brick foundation.  Its front has a porch extending across the front, which has turned posts, a spindlework balustrade and frieze, and jigsawn brackets.  Built in 1902, it is a good local example of vernacular architecture with Folk Victorian details.

The house was listed on the National Register of Historic Places in 1998.

See also
National Register of Historic Places listings in Jefferson County, Arkansas

References

Houses completed in 1902
Houses in Pine Bluff, Arkansas
Houses on the National Register of Historic Places in Arkansas
National Register of Historic Places in Pine Bluff, Arkansas